Sebastien Dechamps (born 12 January 1994) is an Argentine handball player for Quilmes and the Argentine national team.

He participated at the 2017 World Men's Handball Championship.

References

1994 births
Living people
Argentine male handball players
Place of birth missing (living people)
21st-century Argentine people